Zirinsky is a surname. Notable people with the surname include:

Susan Zirinsky (born 1952), American journalist and television news producer
Walt Zirinsky (1920–2001), American football player